Ludington is an unincorporated community in the township of Salt Lick Township, Perry County, Ohio, United States.

Notes

Unincorporated communities in Perry County, Ohio
Unincorporated communities in Ohio